Mundwa  also known as Marwar Mundwa, is a city and a municipality in Nagaur district in the Indian state of Rajasthan.
Mundwa is a tehsil in Nagaur district of Rajasthan State, India. It is located 20 km towards South from district headquarters Nagaur. 231 km from state capital Jaipur towards East.
Marwari is the Local Language here. Also People Speaks Hindi, English, Urdu and Rajasthani.
Mundwa was also a constituency of Rajasthan Assembly before it was changed to Khinvsar because of political reasons. Now Mundwa is made a Tehsil. It is also allotted a Dhan Mandi. It is a pilgrimage centre for the shrine of the Sufi Haz Jana Sahid and is also famous for the lot of temples.

Politics 

Mundwa Constituency of Rajasthan Assembly Result Before Delimitations

 1977 -	Ram Dev	(INC -GEN)
 1980 -	Harendra Mirdha	(INC -GEN)
 1985 -  Ram Dev	(LKD -GEN)
 1990 -	Habibur Rahman	(INC -GEN)
 1995 -  Habiburehman 	(INC -GEN)
 1998 -  Habiburehman 	(INC -GEN)
 2003 -  Usha Punia	(BJP -GEN)

The Panchayat Samiti chief:
 2015 - Rajendra Firoda (INC-GEN)

Geography
It has an average elevation of 335 metres (1099 feet).
There are four Talabs on all the four directions of Mundwa.
Names of these Talabs are
Gyantalav
Lakholav
Pokhandi
Motelav

Demographics
 India census, Mundwa had a population of 16,004. Males constitute 51% of the population and females 49%. Mundwa has an average literacy rate of 47%, lower than the national average of 59.5%: male literacy is 61%, and female literacy is 33%. In Mundwa, 18% of the population is under 6 years of age.

References 
3. http://members.iinet.net.au/~royalty/ips/dynasties/parihar-dynasty.htm

Cities and towns in Nagaur district
Nagaur district